Lepanthes ophelma is a species of orchid endemic to Colombia.

References

External links 

ophelma
Endemic orchids of Colombia